John Hodge (born 1964) is a Scottish screenwriter and dramatist from Glasgow, who adapted Irvine Welsh's novel Trainspotting into the script for the film of the same title. His first play Collaborators won the 2012 Olivier Award for Best New Play. His films include Shallow Grave (1994), Trainspotting (1996) A Life Less Ordinary (1997), The Beach (2000), The Final Curtain (2002), and the short film Alien Love Triangle (2002).

Life and career
Born and raised in Glasgow, Hodge comes from a family of doctors and carried on the tradition by studying medicine at the University of Edinburgh. He was the writer of the annual Medics' Musical in 1988. Hodge started writing screenplays after meeting producer Andrew Macdonald at the Edinburgh Film Festival in 1991. He moved to London after writing Shallow Grave and gave up medicine to concentrate on writing.

His films include Shallow Grave (1994), Trainspotting (1996), A Life Less Ordinary (1997), The Beach (2000), The Final Curtain (2002), and the short film Alien Love Triangle (2002).  Most of his films are directed by Danny Boyle; Shallow Grave, Trainspotting, and A Life Less Ordinary all starred Ewan McGregor. In 2022, Hodge made his first foray into television with the spy thriller television series The Ipcress File for ITV.

Filmography
 Shallow Grave (1994, writer)
 Trainspotting (1996, screenplay)
 A Life Less Ordinary (1997, writer)
 The Beach (2000, screenplay)
 The Final Curtain (2002, writer)
 The Seeker: The Dark Is Rising (2007, screenplay)
 Alien Love Triangle (2008, short, writer)
 The Sweeney (2012, story)
 Trance (2013, screenplay)
 The Program (2015)
 T2 Trainspotting (2017)
 The Ipcress File (2022)

Awards
 1995: BAFTA Award for Best Adapted Screenplay: Trainspotting: Won
 1996: Academy Award for Writing Adapted Screenplay: Trainspotting: Nominated.
 2012 Olivier Award for Best New Play: Collaborators: Won

References

Further reading
 Trainspotting (1996) screenplay by John Hodge
 Monologue from the beginning of Trainspotting

External links
 
 
 John Hodge Filmography at Allmovie
 "How John Hodge wrote the Trainspotting screenplay" Interview by Tim Teeman, The Times, 11 February 2008
 "John Hodge Interview on The Dark Is Rising by Scott Carmichael 27 Jun. 2007 Joblo.com

1964 births
Laurence Olivier Award winners
Living people
Scottish screenwriters
Best Adapted Screenplay BAFTA Award winners
Writers from Glasgow
20th-century Scottish medical doctors
Alumni of the University of Edinburgh
Writers from London
British male screenwriters
English male dramatists and playwrights
Medical doctors from Glasgow